Roman Hryhorovych Viktyuk (28 October 1936 – 17 November 2020) was a Ukrainian theatre director, actor and screenwriter.

Biography
Viktyuk was born in Lwów, Poland, now Lviv, Ukraine.
In 1956 he graduated from the Russian Academy of Theatre Arts in Moscow. Among the teachers were Yuri Zavadsky and Anatoly Efros.

He worked in theaters in Lviv, Kalinin, Tallinn, Vilnius, Minsk, Kyiv, Odessa and Moscow. In the mid-1970s he began to stage performances in Moscow. In the mid-1980s on the stage of the Moscow City Council he has put on the play by Leonid Zorin, Royal Hunt. He gained great fame thanks to  The Maids  by Jean Genet, staged at the Satyricon in 1988.
Since 1991, as artistic director and director, he established private theater (Roman Viktyuk Theater), which in 1996 became state theater. He was the director of a number of dramas on Central Television (Players, 1978, The History of the Chevalier des Grieux and Manon Lescaut, 1980 and Girl, where do you live?, 1982).
He was also Professor of the Russian Academy of Theatre Arts (GITIS).

Died
In late October 2020, Russian media reported that Viktyuk had been taken to an intensive care unit in Moscow after being infected with COVID-19 during the COVID-19 pandemic in Russia. He died there of an associated thromboembolism on 17 November 2020.

Honours and awards
     Kyiv Pectoral Award in Best Performance Drama Theatre (1991) 
Honored Artist of Russia (2003)
People's Artist of Ukraine (2006)
People's Artist of Russia (2009)

References

External links

 Theatre Roman Viktyuk –  Official site 
 Roman Viktyuk online Kino-Teatr.ru

1936 births
2020 deaths
Deaths from the COVID-19 pandemic in Russia
People's Artists of Russia
Recipients of the title of People's Artists of Ukraine
Russian Academy of Theatre Arts alumni
Soviet theatre directors
Ukrainian theatre directors
20th-century Ukrainian male actors
20th-century Russian male actors
21st-century Ukrainian male actors
21st-century Russian male actors
Russian screenwriters
Ukrainian screenwriters
Theatre directors from Moscow